The Intermediate League World Series Host team is one of six United States regions that currently sends teams to the World Series in Livermore, California. The champion of California's District 57 Tournament receives the bid.

Host teams at the Intermediate League World Series
As of the 2022 Intermediate League World Series.

Results by Host
As of the 2022 Intermediate League World Series.

See also
Host teams in other Little League divisions
 Junior League
 Senior League
 Big League

References

Intermediate League World Series
Host